The second seeds James Anderson and Norman Brookes defeated the first-seeded Pat O'Hara Wood and Gerald Patterson 6–2, 6–4, 6–3 in the final, to win the men's doubles tennis title at the 1924 Australasian Championships.

Seeds

  Pat O'Hara Wood /  Gerald Patterson (final)
  James Anderson /  Norman Brookes (champions)
  Tim Fitchett /  Rupert Wertheim (semifinals)
  Les Rainey /  Bob Schlesinger (quarterfinals)

Draw

Finals

Earlier rounds

Section 1

Section 2

Notes

 Some sources give 12–14 as a result of the second set.

References

External links
 Source for seedings

1924 in Australian tennis
Men's Doubles